Piz Cambrena is a mountain in the Bernina Range of the Alps, overlooking the Lago Bianco in the canton of Graubünden. It is situated between Piz Palü and the Bernina Pass.

References

External links

 Piz Cambrena on Hikr

Mountains of Switzerland
Mountains of Graubünden
Mountains of the Alps
Alpine three-thousanders
Bernina Range
Poschiavo
Pontresina